Wilcomb E. Washburn (1925 – 1 February 1997) was an American historian.

Washburn was born in 1925. He received a bachelor's degree from Dartmouth College, and the same year received his PhD in the History of American Civilization from Harvard University. For three years he taught history at the College of William and Mary. In 1958, he joined the Smithsonian Institution, as curator of Political History at the National Museum of American History. Later, he became chair of the Department of American Studies.

From 1968 until 1997, he served as a director for the Smithsonian's American Studies Program. Washburn died in 1997 and is buried in Arlington National Cemetery.

Washburn wrote six books and contributed to two others.  He also wrote 200 journal articles, and contributed chapters to various anthologies.

Works 
The Cambridge History of the Native Peoples of the Americas
1964 — Red Man's Land/White Man's Law
Cosmos Club of Washington
The Governor and the Rebel (1957)
Against the anthropological grain
Virginia under Charles I and Cromwell, 1625-1660
The Native American Renaissance, 1960–1995
Native peoples in Euro-American historiography

References

External links
 
 

1925 births
1997 deaths
Dartmouth College alumni
Smithsonian Institution people
Harvard Graduate School of Arts and Sciences alumni
20th-century American historians
American male non-fiction writers
20th-century American male writers